Cabobanthus polysphaerus is a plant in the family Asteraceae, native to tropical Africa.

Description
The capitula feature about 5 purple flowers. The fruits are achenes.

Distribution and habitat
Cabobanthus polysphaerus is native to the Democratic Republic of the Congo, Tanzania, Angola and Zambia.

References

Vernonieae
Flora of the Democratic Republic of the Congo
Flora of Tanzania
Flora of Angola
Flora of Zambia
Plants described in 1927